McCarran may refer to:

Places

McCarran Field (disambiguation), airports formerly named after Senator Pat McCarran

People

Pat McCarran (1876–1954), US Senator from Nevada

See also
McCarran Internal Security Act, 1950 U.S. law against Communists
McCarran-Ferguson Act, U.S. law in 1945 affecting insurance
McCarran Immigration Act, 1952 US law
McCarran Committee, created 1950 to deal with internal security
McCarran Amendment, 1952 U.S. law on water rights
McCarren Park. in Brooklyn NY
McCarren (disambiguation)